Komaragiripatnam is a village in Allavaram Mandal, Konaseema district in the state of Andhra Pradesh in India.

Geography 

Demographics 
 India census, Komaragiripatnam had a population of 16,197, out of which 6640 were male and 6557 were female. The population of children below 6 years of age was 9%. The literacy rate of the village was 79%.

References 

Villages in Allavaram mandal